Visa requirements for Cambodian citizens are administrative entry restrictions imposed on citizens of Cambodia by the authorities of other states. As of 28 September 2019, Cambodian citizens had visa-free or visa on arrival access to 53 countries and territories, ranking the Cambodian passport 88th in terms of travel freedom (tied with the passports of Equatorial Guinea and Turkmenistan) according to the Henley & Partners Passport Index. Cambodia is also a part of ASEAN and has visa-free access to these countries and vice versa.

Visa requirements map

Visa requirements

Territories and disputed areas
Visa requirements for Cambodian citizens for visits to various territories, disputed areas, partially recognized countries and restricted zones:

Non-visa restrictions

See also

Visa policy of Cambodia
Cambodian passport

Notes

References

Cambodia
Foreign relations of Cambodia